Novobaltachevo (Yañı Baltas) is a rural locality (a selo) and the administrative centre of Novobaltachevsky Selsoviet, Chekmagushevsky District, Bashkortostan, Russia. The population was 820 as of 2010. There are 7 streets.

Geography 
Novobaltachevo is located 16 km west of Chekmagush (the district's administrative centre) by road. Lenino is the nearest rural locality.

References 

Rural localities in Chekmagushevsky District